Rafał Gaweł is the founder of the Racist and Xenophobic Behaviour Monitoring Centre ( OMZRiK), a Polish anti-racism monitoring group. In 2019 Polish authorities sentenced him to a two-year prison term. Gaweł was awarded temporary political asylum on 30 September 2020 in Norway. The asylum  was granted for three reasons: the lack of the possibility of a fair trial, the lack of Polish authorities' control of extreme-right militias, and the criminal case against him appearing to constitute political persecution by Polish authorities. The event was the first in which a Polish person was granted political asylum after the fall of Communism in Poland.

Theatre and OMZRiK

OMZRiK monitored crimes involving racist motives and submitted legal cases against them. In 2017, OMZRiK lodged 45 legal cases of this sort. Gaweł stated that the Prosecutor's office was unhappy to receive the complaints.

One of OMZRiK's cases that achieved major media interest was related to a prosecutor, Dawid Roszkowski, who refused to carry out prosecutions for use of the swastika on the grounds of its use in Hinduism. Roszkowski's superior was fired. Roszkowski was later promoted to head of the South Białystok Prosecutor's Office.

Criminal case
Gaweł pleaded not guilty. The Stefan Batory Foundation denied the claim that it had been defrauded.

In January 2019, Gaweł was sentenced to two years' prison, after having appealed an initial sentence of four years. According to the court, the lowering of the sentence was related to Gaweł having returned some of the funds that he had been awarded and had allocated for private use.

Political asylum
On 7 January 2019, Gaweł and his family fled for his safety to Norway, without a passport, and with help from "a diplomatic contact". He and his family were awarded political asylum on 30 September 2020 in Norway for three reasons: he had an unfair trial and was unlikely to obtain a fair trial; Polish authorities did not prevent the activities of right-wing militias; and the criminal case against him appeared to be a case of political persecution by Polish authorities. Gaweł's lawyer, Łukasz Niedzielski, described Gaweł's situation as political persecution disguised as a criminal case.

Gaweł's case is a rare case of asylum granted in Europe to a European Union (EU) citizen. One Pole was granted asylum in Norway in 2019, out of 18 EU citizens granted asylum in Norway during 2010–2019.

Gaweł was given an initial refugee status for one year, which is renewable and convertible to permanent residency.

External links
 OMZRiK website

References

Polish human rights activists
Living people
Refugees in Norway
Polish dissidents
Year of birth missing (living people)
People from Białystok
20th-century births